Azodiyeh (also Romanized as Azodīyeh, Āzādiyeh, and ‘Aẕodīyeh; also known as Qal‘eh Sheykh and Qal‘eh-ye ‘Azodīyeh) is a village in Astaneh Rural District, in the Central District of Shazand County, Markazi Province, Iran. At the 2006 census, its population was 400, in 128 families.

References 

Populated places in Shazand County